Telomerization is a reaction that produces a particular kind of oligomer with two distinct end groups.  The oligomer is called a telomer.  Some telomerizations proceed by radical pathways, many do not. A generic equation is:
 A-B + n M -> A-M_{n}-B
where M is the monomer, and A and B are the end groups, and n is the degree of polymerization.

One example is the coupled dimerization and hydroesterification of 1,3-butadiene. This step produces a doubly unsaturated C9-ester:
2CH2=CH-CH=CH2  +  CO +  CH3OH → CH2=CH(CH2)3CH=CHCH2CO2CH3
The monomer in this reaction is butadiene, the degree of polymerization is 2, and the end groups are vinyl and the carboxy methyl (CO2CH3). This and several related reactions proceed with palladium catalysts.  Many telomerizations are used in industrial chemistry.

Nomenclature
According to the jargon in polymer chemistry, telomerization requires a telogen to react with at least one unsaturated taxogen molecule. Fluorotelomers are an example.

See also
Perfluorooctanoic acid (synthesis)
Telomerization (dimerization)

References

Chemical synthesis
Chemical processes
Industrial processes
Polymer chemistry
Oligomers